The Red Cossacks was a military formation of Bolsheviks and the Soviet government of Ukraine. Red Cossacks was a collective name for one of the biggest cavalry formations of the Workers' and Peasants' Red Army (RKKA) and was part of the Ukrainian, Southern, and Southwestern fronts during the Russian Civil War and later was stationed in the Ukrainian SSR.

According to Vitaly Primakov, the formation was created in protection of the Soviet government in Ukraine, the liquidation of the "nationalistic and counter-revolutionary" Central Council of Ukraine and as an opposing force to the Central Council's armed forces known as the "Free Cossacks".

History
He also participated against the Kerensky–Krasnov uprising. The formation of the military unit continued until 9 February 1918.

In the beginning after announcing the formation, the military unit was joined by soldiers of former 3rd battalion of 2nd Ukrainian Reserve Regiment (300 individuals) who were disarmed by revolutionary detachments (1st Moscow Revolutionary Regiment headed by Pavel Yegorov) from Soviet Russia. The newly announced military unit also included local Red guards (400 individuals) of several Kharkiv factories such as Kharkiv Locomotive Factory (now the Malyshev Factory), the General Electric Company (Vseobshchaya kompaniya elektrichestva) and the Helfferich-Sade Association. With time, Red Cossack detachments were established where Soviet power was declared including Kharkiv Governorate, Poltava Governorate, and Kyiv Governorate. The formations were established voluntarily and composed out of workers and peasants predominantly Ukrainians, but also contained other ethnic representatives (Russians, Jews, others). Sister of Yuriy Kotsiubynsky, Oksana was in charge of agitation and propaganda and chief editor of Red Cossack newspaper "To arms". On  the People's Secretariat of Ukraine issued its decree about organization of People's Revolutionary and Socialist Army in Ukraine, the Red Cossacks.

At first in January 1918 the regiment as part of the Soviet 4th Revolutionary Army took part in advance against the troops loyal to Central Council of Ukraine and then in fought against the advance of German and Ukrainian forces in March–April 1918 (following the Treaty of Brest-Litovsk). On 1 March 1918 soldiers of the 1st Horse Regiment of Red Cossacks attempted to rename their regiment to the 1st Workers-Peasants Socialist Regiment of the Red Army. After that the regiment was "cleansed" from non-Ukrainian element by Soviet government. During liberation of Ukraine from Bolsheviks, number of Red Cossacks sided with the Army of Ukrainian People's Republic (UNR) after the 1918 Battle of Poltava. After being withdrawn out of Ukraine, in summer of 1918 it was reformed into the 1st Dnieper Partizan detachment that operated in so called "neutral zone" that was established along the Russia–Ukraine border.

During the fall of 1918 it was reestablished as part of the 1st Ukrainian Soviet Division and then the 2nd Ukrainian Soviet Division that fought against the Army of UNR. As part of the Army Group of Kyiv direction in May 1919 participated in suppression of Nykyfor Hryhoriv rebellion and in July–September 1919 fought against armies of Anton Denikin (Armed Forces of South Russia).

In August 1919 the regiment was expanded into brigade that was part of 12th and 14th armies of the Workers and Peasants Red Army (RKKA). In October 1919 it expanded further into the 8th Cavalry Division of Red Cossacks which in November of same year conducted a raid across the Denikin's Army rears. In April 1920 battled in the Northern Taurida Governorate against the Pyotr Wrangel's troops. Soon after the Polish-Ukrainian union treaty of Warsaw in 1920, the division participated in the Polish–Soviet War. During that campaign it reached the city of Stryi, but during a retreat of the Red Army, it was encircled and partially destroyed at Zbruch River.

Notable Cossacks
Filipp Mironov
Syla Mishchenko
Bublyk brothers
Vitaly Primakov
Rudolf Sivers

Photos and documents

See also
Red Army
Ukrainian–Soviet War
1st Cavalry Division (Soviet Union)

Further reading
Dubinskiy, I., Shevchuk, G. Chervonnoye kazachestvo. Kyiv, 1977

References

External links
Red avatars of Ukraine: military uniforms of the Primakov's eagles (Червоні аватари України: уніформа орлів Примакова.) based on the book of Yaroslav Tynchenko "Red Cossacks. 1917–1925. Organization and uniform"..
Red avatars of Ukraine: Forgotten stepson of the Revolution (Червоні аватари України: Забутий пасинок революції).
Zdorov, A. The 1918 Red Cossacks appeared before the Red Army (1918 рік. Червоне козацтво з'явилося раніше Червоної армії). Ukrayinska Pravda. 23 February 2011.

Cossack military units and formations
Military history of Russia
Military history of Ukraine
Polish–Soviet War
Russian Civil War
Red Guards (Russia)
Soviet units and formations of the Russian Civil War
Ukrainian–Soviet War
Ukrainian military formations